Astrosansonia dautzenbergi is a species of small sea snail, a marine gastropod mollusk, in the family Pickworthiidae.

Distribution
This species occurs in the Western Pacific Ocean off Wallis Islands.

References

Works cited
 Le Renard J. & Bouchet P. 2003. — New species and genera of the family Pickworthiidae (Mollusca, Caenogastropoda). Zoosystema 25 (4): 569-591

External links
 To World Register of Marine Species

Pickworthiidae